Susan Powell may refer to:

Susan Powell (Miss America) (born 1959), American actress, singer, and television personality
Susan Powell (weather forecaster), British weather reporter for the BBC
Susan Powell (cyclist) (born 1967), Australian Paralympic cyclist
Susan Marie Powell (born 1981), American woman disappearing in 2009
Sue Powell, member of the band Dave & Sugar

See also
Sue Powell-Reed, Welsh radio & television broadcaster
Susan Noel-Powell (born 1913), English squash and tennis player